Oh, Doctor Beeching! is a BBC television sitcom written by David Croft and Richard Spendlove which, after a broadcast pilot on 14 August 1995, ran for two series from 8 July 1996, with the last episode being broadcast on 28 September 1997. The series is notable for being the last in a series of three comedies by co-writer David Croft to use many of the same actors, starting with Hi-de-Hi! and followed by You Rang, M'Lord? and was also the last full series written by Croft.

Introduction 
Oh, Doctor Beeching! focuses on the small fictional branch line railway station of Hatley, which is threatened with closure under the Beeching Axe. The programme was filmed on the Severn Valley Railway. Arley SVR station in Upper Arley was used as Hatley station.

Plot 
Set in 1963, at a rural branch line railway station called Hatley, Jack Skinner (Paul Shane) the porter is acting stationmaster until a replacement is found. Jack deeply loves his wife May (played by Sherrie Hewson in the pilot episode, with her scenes re-recorded by Julia Deakin when repeated as the first episode of the regular series) who runs the station buffet, but is prone to becoming very jealous of her around other men. Since the retirement of the previous station master the station has become rather disorganised: for instance the eternally miserable signalman Harry Lambert (Stephen Lewis), is so underworked that he is running several sidelines from his signalbox – including hair-cutting, selling fruit and vegetables, keeping turkeys, pigs and chickens, repairing bicycles and taking bets – seeing his signalling duties as an unwelcome distraction; he frequently speaks of "ruddy trains". The station is part run by the eccentric and easily flustered booking clerk Ethel Schumann (Su Pollard), who is always on the lookout for a new man in her life and whose son Wilfred (Paul Aspden), the product of a relationship with a now deceased American soldier during the war, is the station dogsbody. Wilfred often comes across as stupid, but sometimes displays signs that he is brighter than he appears – for instance in the episode "The Van", he finds Arnold's missing wife Jessica.

Also present are Vera Plumtree (Barbara New), who has no particular role, but seems to do various jobs around the station and acts as Mr Parkin's housekeeper. Her late husband used to work on the railway, as she frequently reminds the other members of staff; her catchphrase is "he was an engine driver you know". She very often muddles her words and seems to be fond of Harry (who always ignores her advances) and Gloria (Lindsay Grimshaw), Jack and May's pretty teenage daughter, who loves wearing short skirts, much to the chagrin of her father. She shows an interest in men, but Jack is over-protective and will not let any man take her out. Several other members of railway staff appear, including an older engine driver Arnold Thomas (Ivor Roberts); his inexperienced fireman Ralph (Perry Benson), who is training to be a driver; and the flirtatious guard, Percy (Terry John), with whom Ethel appears to be quite besotted at times. He returns her advances, but seems to prefer Gloria's friend, Amy Matlock (Tara Daniels), who appears in most episodes, albeit usually briefly. Richard Spendlove, one of the writers and the co-creator, also appeared in several episodes as Mr Orkindale, the district inspector.

Soon the new stationmaster arrives in the guise of Cecil Parkin (Jeffrey Holland), a stern, well spoken man. He is amazed to learn that the café is run by May (then called Blanchflower), with whom he had a passionate fling during the war before she married Jack – although we later learn that she was seeing both of them at the same time. Although Jack is in the dark as to May and Cecil's history, he takes an instant dislike to the new stationmaster. A running subplot to the series is the question of whether Gloria is actually Jack's daughter, or the result of May's fling with Cecil (although in the second series episode "Father's Day", it is generally concluded that Jack is her father). Meanwhile, at the end of the episode a newspaper article is found threatening the station with closure under the Beeching Axe, which begins the series.

A running gag in the series is Vera almost finding out about Cecil and May's relationship. Mr Parkin steals every moment he possibly can with May, often sneaking into the kitchen near the beginning of the day, before anyone else has arrived and Vera catching them almost every time.

The series ran for two series, although the final episode did not conclude by answering whether the station was going to be closed, as it was unknown at the time of production whether a third series would be produced or not. The series was axed due to unsatisfactory viewing figures, later blamed on the BBC for constantly altering the time of broadcasting. Only one episode was broadcast in August 1997 (17) due to the broadcasting of the 1997 Athletics World Championship in Athens on 3 and 10 August, The Great Antiques Hunt broadcast on 24 August and the wall to wall coverage of the Death of Diana, Princess of Wales, on 31 August.

Main cast
Cecil Parkin (Jeffrey Holland) Stationmaster – the new stationmaster at Hatley who appears midway through the first episode. He is a perfectionist and is determined to make the station the best on the line. On the surface, he seems refined, but it turns out that he knows the station's buffet manager because they had a passionate affair, which was going on behind her boyfriend (later husband) Jack Skinner's back. He still has lecherous thoughts about her and in several episodes he tries his best to get her to leave Jack. The station staff react to him in different ways – most are tolerant of him, but Jack and Harry, the signalman, take an intense dislike to him, which only slightly mellows as the series goes on.

Jack Skinner (Paul Shane) Head Porter and Deputy Stationmaster – He is deeply in love with his beautiful wife, May, but gets very jealous whenever she comes into close contact with other men, especially Cecil. He heartily dislikes Cecil and shows it. He is an ex-soldier with a limp from a wound he supposedly received during the war – only in Episode 9 we learn that his leg was wounded when he was thrown out of a pub and the landlord's wife slammed the door on his foot, not during a battle, although Ethel changed the story to him jumping on a German tank to shove a land mine down it and a big German trapped his foot in the door.

Ethel Schumann (Su Pollard) Ticket Clerk – She is scatter-brained and sometimes muddles her words. She often gets frustrated with Jack for his jealousy of May. She is also a flirt – she has a son from her marriage to a now deceased American soldier named Earl, whom she frequently refers to in the earlier episodes. She is desperate for another boyfriend and frequently makes advances to the station's guard, Percy, who appreciates her advances, but seems more interested in the regular commuter, Amy. She is the only one who knows of Cecil and May's war-time fling once May tells her.

Harry Lambert (Stephen Lewis) Signalman – He is eternally miserable, with Stephen Lewis portraying the character very much like "Blakey" in On the Buses. He never smiles and often sees the down side of things, never being seen happy. He hates his job, often calling the trains "ruddy". Because trains come through Hatley only a few times a day, he operates numerous sidelines from his box: growing vegetables, mending bikes and clocks, rearing farm animals (pigs, turkeys and chickens) for the staff's dinners, giving haircuts and taking bets. They are all illegal, yet all the staff, including Gloria know about them, are customers and keep their mouths shut. Cecil does not know, as he would make it stop. There is a recurring gag, where Harry will say, "if they poke their noses around, they will get the flat end o' my tongue", that person comes and he starts sucking up to them. He often resists Vera's advances.

May Skinner (née Blanchflower) (Julia Deakin) Buffet Manageress – She had a passionate affair with Cecil Parkin before she married Jack, which ended when Cecil was called up to serve in the Army. She appears to genuinely love Jack, but she seems to still have buried feelings for Cecil. She frequently resists Cecil's advances, but occasionally relents, even letting him kiss her in Episode 10, but states that it must never happen again. In early episodes it is hinted that Cecil is the father of her daughter, Gloria, but this is proved to be false in Episode 11. The character of May was played by Sherrie Hewson in the original pilot episode shown in August 1995. Because of her role in Coronation Street, Hewson was unable to continue with the role of May in the series proper, so the character was recast to Julia Deakin. When the pilot episode was repeated as a prelude to the first series in July 1996, Hewson's scenes as May were reshot with Deakin in the role.

Vera Plumtree (Barbara New) Cleaner – She helps the staff by cleaning their homes and washing linen for them. She has a lot in common with Ethel: she muddles her words and frequently talks about her unnamed late husband, who was an engine driver. She is fond of Harry, but he is not interested in her.

Wilfred Schumann (Paul Aspden, credited as Paul Aspen) Porter – Ethel's son. Most of the time he comes across as extremely stupid. He is often verbally abused and hit around the head by Jack. Wilfred joins the Army in one episode so as to allow Ethel to elope with her new American airmen boyfriend, but she ends the relationship. Wilfred was born in 1946, making him 17.

Gloria Skinner (Lindsay Grimshaw) – Jack and May's daughter. A rebellious teenager, very fond of short skirts and the company of older men. Jack is over-protective and will let no man in the station take Gloria out. Gloria was born in February 1945, making her 18.

Percy (Terry John) Guard – the main station flirt. He flirts with every woman he comes into contact with, except Vera. But he seems to prefer Amy above others: he takes her out on several dates during the series, often leaving Ethel in the lurch. We learn in Episode 14 that he keeps promising to take Ethel out, but never does.

Arnold Thomas (Ivor Roberts) Train Driver – An older train-driver. He is the star of the penultimate episode, where he goes to great lengths to make sure he is not sacked. He has a wife called Jessica, who appears to be forgetful. He alludes to her in almost every episode, but she only appears briefly in an uncredited role in Episode 13. The actress was Ivor Roberts' real life wife also.

Ralph (Perry Benson) Fireman and Trainee Driver – Works with Arnold – the two often engage in comic banter. Ralph can be as daft as Wilfred and is slow at learning to drive – but he drives the train perfectly in the final episode. One episode centres around him – in Episode 14 he threatens to go on strike. It is also revealed that he has a crush on Gloria.

Amy (Tara Daniels), best school friend of Gloria's, she appears in most of the episodes. She is often the object of Percy's desires.

Mr Orkindale (Richard Spendlove) District Inspector – Senior to Parkin, calls staff by Christian names and fancies May. Dislikes Mr Parkin as much as everyone else and in Episode 17 cheats him out of a place on the bowls club outing just so he can have a few extra drinks.

Guest appearances
Other actors who had previously collaborated with David Croft made guest appearances. A former Hi-De-Hi! regular Felix Bowness made a number of appearances as train guard Bernie Bleasdale. Windsor Davies appeared in the final episode as the mayor of Clumberfield, when the station staff re-enacted the station's opening for its 100th anniversary. James Pertwee, son of the actor Bill Pertwee, made an appearance as a photographer in this final episode also. 
Sally Grace appeared in Episode 7 as Mr Parkin's fiancée, Edna. Hugh Lloyd made an appearance in one episode as a chauffeur.

Featured locomotive

The LMS Ivatt Class 2 2-6-0 No 46521 from the Severn Valley Railway was used on the film set and carried the name "Blossom". At the time of filming the engine normally resided on the Severn Valley Railway. Blossom was subsequently sold to the Loughborough Standard Locomotive Group, who are based at the Great Central Railway. The engine was on loan to different railways before having an overhaul, after which it returned to service with a main line 'ticket'.
In April 2013 this locomotive was derailed after running through a set of trap points on the Great Central Railway!

Title and music 
The title was a reference to the music hall song and Will Hay film Oh, Mr Porter! and a modified version was sung as the end titles by actress Su Pollard:

Oh, Dr Beeching what have you done?
There once were lots of trains to catch, but soon there will be none,
I'll have to buy a bike, 'cos I can't afford a car,
Oh, Dr Beeching what a naughty man you are!

Episodes

Series overview

Pilot (1995)

Series 1 (1996)

Series 2 (1997)

Home release 
The first series was released on VHS and DVD in 2004 and the second series on DVD only, in 2005. The packaging of the first series was slightly misleading by stating that it "included the pilot", but it really contained the revised first episode and not the original version of the pilot.
Edits are made to certain episodes because of copyright music issues.

A complete box set containing both series and all 19 episodes (also including the original pilot) was made available, distributed by Acorn Media UK in 2009. It was later discontinued but it was made available again in 2017.

References

External links

1990s British sitcoms
1995 British television series debuts
1997 British television series endings
BBC television sitcoms
David Croft sitcoms
Television series about rail transport
Television series set in 1963
English-language television shows